Petr Pokorný (born 28 December 1975) is a Czech footballer. Between 1995 and 2001 he played in the Czech First League, making 130 appearances.

References

External links

1975 births
Living people
Czech footballers
Czech Republic under-21 international footballers
Czech First League players
FK Teplice players
FC Hradec Králové players
FK Mladá Boleslav players
Śląsk Wrocław players
Zagłębie Lubin players
Górnik Polkowice players
Czech expatriate footballers
Expatriate footballers in Poland
Czech expatriate sportspeople in Poland
Association football defenders
Sportspeople from Hradec Králové